The 2004 Sabah state election was held on Sunday, 21 March 2004, concurrently with the 2004 Malaysian general election. This election featured 12 new state seats increasing the total seats from 48 to 60. There was also an additional three parliament seats in Sabah following the 2003 delineation of electoral boundaries. The Barisan Nasional (BN) coalition comprehensively won this election after the only major opposition party in Sabah, Parti Bersatu Sabah (PBS) re-joined the BN coalition in 2002.

Results

Barisan Nasional won 59 out of 60 state seats. Out of the 59 seats won, 8 seats was won uncontested.  One state seat was won by independent candidate Johan Ghani in Kuala Penyu.

BN also won 24 out of 25 parliamentary seats in Sabah, where 9 seats was won uncontested. One parliamentary seat was won by independent candidate Chong Hon Ming in Sandakan.

References

2004
2004 elections in Malaysia